Rastislav Božik is a Slovak football manager who was most recently the fitness coach of the Malaysia Super League club Sabah.

Career
Božik has coached in Slovakia, Vietnam, the United Arab Emirates, Malaysia, and Mongolia.

References

People from Nová Baňa
Sportspeople from the Banská Bystrica Region
Slovak football managers
Slovak expatriate football managers
FC Nitra managers
Mongolia national football team managers
1977 births
Living people